Amy is a 1981 American drama film directed by Vincent McEveety and starring Jenny Agutter. It was produced by Walt Disney Productions, distributed by Buena Vista Distribution, and written by Noreen Stone.

Plot 
In 1913, Amy Medford (Jenny Agutter) leaves her possessive, wealthy husband (Chris Robinson) to begin a new life teaching speech to deaf students in the rural Appalachian Mountains at a school for blind and deaf children. Though encountering resistance from those who question whether it’s even possible to teach speech to children with hearing-impairments, Amy becomes close to the staff and children, building a new life for herself and gaining the personal strength she will need to stand up to the domineering husband who is not content to let her live her own life.

Cast 

 Jenny Agutter as Amy Medford
 Barry Newman as Dr. Ben Corcoran
 Kathleen Nolan as Helen Gibbs
 Chris Robinson as Elliot Medford
 Lou Fant as Lyle Ferguson
 Margaret O'Brien as Hazel Johnson
 Nanette Fabray as Malvina
 Lance LeGault as Edgar Wanbuck
 Lucille Benson as Rose Metcalf 
 Jonathan Daly as Clyde Pruett
 Lonny Chapman as Virgil Goodloe 
 Brian Frishman as Mervin Grimes 
 Jane Daly as Molly Tribble 
 Dawn Jeffory as Caroline Chapman 
 Peggy McCay as Mrs. Grimes
 Len Wayland as Mr. Grimes
 Virginia Vincent as Edna Hancock 
 Norman Burton as Caruthers 
 Otto Rechenberg as Henry Watkins
 David Hollander as Just George
 Cory 'Bumper' Yothers as Wesley Moody
 Alban Branton as Eugene
 Ronnie Scribner as Walter Ray
 Michelle Downey as Essie
 Carson Sipes as Dwayne
 Diana Boyd as Loretta
 Flavia Fleischer as Iris
 David Jacob Weiss as Glenn
 Oscar Arturo Aguilar as Chester
 Kevin van Wieringen as Owen Corner
 Seamon Glass as Mr. Watkins
 Nancy Jeris as Mrs. Watkins
 Randy Morton as Teenage Boy
 Lance Gordon as Referee
 John Arndt as Mr. Pool
 Rick Foster as Football Player
 Elisha Rapson as Blind Girl

Production
Amy was originally filmed as a television movie titled Amy on the Lips, and was the first television movie that Disney Studios made for an adult audience. Nanette Fabray and Louise Fletcher were interested in the role of “Malvina,” a teacher of deaf children. Fabray, who played the part, was hearing impaired, and Fletcher’s parents were deaf. The deaf children in the film, except for Brian Frishman, were students from the California School for the Deaf in Riverside, California. Dawn Jeffory, who was cast as Caroline Chapman, had a real-life role as a guest instructor at the school, and was helpful to director Vincent McEveety in working with the children. Lyle Ferguson, the school superintendent, was played by Lou Fant, a son of deaf parents, who helped establish the National Theatre for the Deaf. In January 1981, it was announced the film's title would be changed to Amy and given a theatrical release as Walt Disney Productions felt the film was “so powerful” it warranted a theatrical release.

Educational film 
In 1982, Disney Educational Services excerpted a sequence from the film for educational use, entitled Amy-on-the-Lips.

Release
The film was released on a double bill on a re-release of Alice in Wonderland.

Home media
Disney released a manufactured-on-demand DVD of the film as part of their "Disney Generations Collection" line of DVDs on June 26, 2011.

See also
 List of films featuring the deaf and hard of hearing

References

External links 
 
 Amy DVD
 
 

1981 drama films
1981 films
American drama films
Films about deaf people
Films about educators
Films directed by Vincent McEveety
Films set in 1913
Walt Disney Pictures films
1980s English-language films
1980s American films
Films about disability